Ludovic: The Snow Gift is a Canadian animated short film, directed by Co Hoedeman and released in 1998. The film centres on Ludovic, a baby teddy bear who finds solace in a dancing and singing doll, after his father forbids him from going tobogganing because he's too little. Inspired by Hoedeman's own childhood teddy bear, the film was animated primarily through stop motion animation of puppets.

After premiering in 1998, the film was screened in 1999 as the opening film to theatrical screenings of Babar: King of the Elephants.

The film received a Genie Award nomination for Best Animated Short Film at the 20th Genie Awards.

Several sequel films, Ludovic: A Crocodile in My Garden (2000), Ludovic: Visiting Grandpa (2001) and Ludovic: Magic in the Air (2002), were released over the next number of years.

References

External links
 Watch Ludovic: The Snow Gift at the National Film Board of Canada
 

1998 short films
1998 films
Canadian animated short films
National Film Board of Canada animated short films
1990s English-language films
1990s Canadian films